A break-in record is a novelty record which combines spoken word comedy with clips of popular music to create a humorous effect. The subject matter was often inspired by contemporary events or popular culture such as television shows and films. Such comedy recordings were popular in the United States for several decades beginning in 1956 with "The Flying Saucer" by Dickie Goodman and Bill Buchanan.

Notable break-in records

References

Lists of songs by genre
Novelty songs